"Don't Wanna Be Left Out" and "Good-Day Ray" are songs from Powderfinger's third studio album Internationalist. These songs were released together as a single on 9 November 1998, which reached the top 60 on the ARIA Singles Chart.

Music video

Videos were made for both singles. They both featured the band performing in a white room. "Don't Wanna Be Left Out" shows Bernard Fanning wearing extensive makeup and white clothing, whereas "Good-Day Ray" has him in black clothing and with no makeup. He also has long hair, a change from the previous video.

Track listing
 "Don't Wanna Be Left Out"
 "Good-Day Ray"
 "Corner Boy"
 "Paul's Theme"

Charts

References

Powderfinger songs
1998 singles